Lorimer Fison (9 November 1832 – 29 December 1907) was an Australian anthropologist, Methodist minister and journalist.

Early life
Fison was born at Barningham, Suffolk, England, the son of Thomas Fison, a prosperous landowner, and his wife Charlotte, a daughter of the Rev. John Reynolds, who was a translator of seventeenth-century religious writers. Fison was educated at a school at Sheffield, then at the University of Cambridge where he read with a tutor before becoming a student of Caius College in June 1855. After a "boyish escapade" at college he left for Australia.

Career in Australia and Fiji
In 1856 Fison arrived in Australia and while at the gold diggings the news of the unexpected death of his father led to his conversion to active Christianity. He went to Melbourne, joined the Methodist church, and after some further study at the University of Melbourne offered himself for missionary service in Fiji. He was ordained a minister and sailed for Fiji in 1864 with his wife Jane. His first seven-year term as a missionary was very successful. The Rev. George Brown in an article in the Australasian Methodist Missionary Review wrote that Fison was "one of the best missionaries whom God has ever given to our church". His honesty, kindliness, tact and commonsense were appreciated alike by government officials, white settlers, and the natives themselves. He became much interested in Fijian customs and in 1870 was able to give Lewis H. Morgan, the American ethnologist, some interesting information relating to the Tongan and Fijian systems of relationship. This was incorporated as a supplement to Part III of Morgan's Systems of Consanguinity and Affinity (1871). When Fison returned to Australia in 1871 he began investigating similar problems in connexion with the aborigines. This led to his becoming acquainted with Alfred William Howitt, with whom he was afterwards to do a great deal of worthwhile work in Australian anthropology.

Fison returned to Fiji in 1875 and, when the training institution for natives was established, he became its principal. He did excellent work and the effects of his influence on the Fijians was long felt. He published a life of Christ, Ai Tukutuku Kei Jisu, and also wrote a valuable pamphlet on the native system of land tenure in Fiji. This little treatise became a classic of its kind and was reprinted by the government printer, Fiji, more than 20 years later. Though so far away he continued his study of the Australian aborigines; his preface to the section on Kamilaroi marriage descent and relationships in Kamilaroi and Kurnai (1880), by Lorimer Fison and A. W. Howitt, is dated Fiji, August 1878. He also collected the materials for the interesting legends afterwards published under the title of Tales from Old Fiji (1904), during this time.

Fison returned to Australia in 1884 and for most of the remainder of his life lived near Melbourne. He retired from the ministry in 1888 and from then to 1905 edited the Spectator and made it one of the best Melbourne church papers. At the meeting of the Australasian Association for the Advancement of Science held at Hobart in 1892 he was president of the anthropological section, and from the chair, with charming candour, pointed out that a theory of the Kurnai system, which he had worked out with infinite pains in Kamilaroi and Kurnai, was "not worth a rush". In 1894 he visited England and attended the meeting of the British association at Oxford. There he met Max Müller, Professor Edward Burnett Tylor and many other distinguished scientists. At Cambridge he became acquainted with Dr., later Sir James Frazer, who was much impressed by his frank and manly nature. Fison was critical of John Mathew's book Eaglehawk and Crow (1899), seemingly provoked by Mathew's challenge to his own group-marriage theories and perhaps by Mathew's amateur status.

Late life
Fison continued to do a large amount of journalistic work and even when he was past 70 years of age had to work very hard to make a bare living. In 1905 Fison was granted a civil list pension of £150 a year by the British government. He had become very weak in body though his mind retained its sharpness. Fison died on 29 December 1907 at Essendon, Melbourne. He was survived by his wife, two sons and four daughters.

Notes

References
 
W. E. H. Stanner, 'Fison, Lorimer (1832 - 1907)', Australian Dictionary of Biography, Volume 4, MUP, 1972, pp 175–176. Retrieved on 19 October 2008.
Additional sources listed by the Australian Dictionary of Biography:
C. Irving Benson (ed), A Century of Victorian Methodism (Melbourne, 1935); C. B. Fletcher, The Black Knight of the Pacific (Sydney, 1944); G. Brown, ‘Lorimer Fison’, Australasian Methodist Missionary Review, Feb 1908; J. G. Frazer, ‘Howitt and Fison’, Folk-Lore (London), 20 (1909); B. J. Stern (ed), ‘Selections from the letters of Lorimer Fison … to Lewis Henry Morgan’, American Anthropologist, 32 (1930); The Age (Melbourne), 31 December 1907

External links

 Kamilaroi and Kurnai book details, 

1832 births
1907 deaths
Australian anthropologists
People from the Borough of St Edmundsbury
English emigrants to colonial Australia
19th-century Australian journalists